The 2011 Northeast Conference baseball tournament began on May 20 and ended on May 22, 2011, at Senator Thomas J. Dodd Memorial Stadium in Norwich, Connecticut.  The league's top four teams competed in the double elimination tournament.  Second-seeded  won their second tournament championship and earned the Northeast Conference's automatic bid to the 2011 NCAA Division I baseball tournament.  The Pioneers were runners up in the previous two years

Seeding and format
The top four finishers were seeded one through four based on conference regular-season winning percentage. Bryant was ineligible for postseason play, as it completed its transition to Division I.

Bracket

All-Tournament Team
The following players were named to the All-Tournament Team.

Most Valuable Player
John Murphy was named Tournament Most Valuable Player.  Murphy was a sophomore shortstop for Sacred Heart.

References

Tournament
Northeast Conference Baseball Tournament
Northeast Conference baseball tournament
Northeast Conference baseball tournament